State Highway 147 (abbreviated SH-147) is a state highway in Oklahoma. It runs  in Choctaw and Pushmataha counties. Highway 147 begins at US-70, just east of Sawyer. From there it runs north, up the east side of Hugo Lake. There is a one-mile (1.6 km) dogleg to the east just south of the community of Spencerville, and another short dogleg east at the Choctaw–Pushmataha county line. SH-147 terminates at SH-3 in Oleta.

Route description
SH-147 begins at US-70 in Sawyer. The route heads north, running east of Hugo Lake and crossing over several of the streams that feed it, including Cedar Creek. The highway continues north to a small lake called Schooler Lake, which it passes just east of. The highway then turns east, passing through a series of curves, before returning to a due north course; this section lies east of the community of Spencerville and crosses Spencer Creek. The highway turns east once again at the Choctaw–Pushmataha county line, straddling the border for about a quarter of a mile. The highway returns to a due north course, fully entering Pushmataha County, until Oleta, where it terminates at SH-3.

History

Junction list

References

External links

 SH-147 at OKHighways

147
Transportation in Choctaw County, Oklahoma
Transportation in Pushmataha County, Oklahoma